The Battle of the Novogorodians with the Suzdalians (битва новгородцев с суздальцами) is a twelfth-century episode in which the city of Novgorod the Great was said to have been miraculously delivered from a besieging army from Suzdalia (the area around Vladimir, Suzdal, and Moscow.)  In the fifteenth and sixteenth centuries, the episode became the basis for several hagiographic tales in the Russian church, as well as two large icons executed in the late fifteenth and early sixteenth centuries (and now housed respectively in the Novgorod Museum and the Russian Museum in St. Petersburg.)

The Battle in History
The episode took place in 1169 when Andrei Bogolyubsky, Prince of Vladimir (on the Kliazma), besieged the city.  His protégé in Novgorod, Prince Sviatoslav Rostislavich, had left Novgorod in 1167 upon the death of his father (Grand Prince Rostislav Mstislavich, who had also backed his reign in Novgorod).  When the new Kievan grand prince, Mstislav Iziaslavich, sent his son, Roman, to be prince of Novgorod, Andrei fought to return Sviatoslav to the Novgorodian throne, sending his army to besiege Novgorod and force them to drive out Roman and take back Sviatoslav.  During the siege, Archbishop Ilya of Novgorod, ordered that the Icon of the Mother of God of the Sign (ru: Bogomater Znamenie or Богоматер Знамение) be brought from the Church of the Transfiguration on Ilin Street on the eastern edge of the city, across the great bridge spanning the Volkhov River, and into the Detinets to be venerated in the Cathedral of Holy Wisdom and displayed from the Detinets walls  give the Novgorodians courage.  According to the legend, when the deacon went to the church, he (miraculously) could not lift the icon and went back to report this to the archbishop, who went himself over the bridge to the church and processed with the icon back to the Detinets.  the icon was then displayed on the walls and, according to the tale, struck by a Suzdalian arrow, at which time, according to the legend, it wept.  The legend went on to say that through the intercessions of the Mother of God and of Archbishop Ilya, and several other saints (most notably Boris and Gleb and St. George, all depicted in the icons of the battle leading the Novgorodian army out against the Suzdalians), the Novgorodians were able to defeat the Suzdalians, after which Prince Andrei withdrew back to Suzdalia.

Bogolyubsky was, in fact, able to place his candidate on the Novgorodian throne the following year.  The Novgorodians dismissed Sviatoslav in 1170.  Bogolyubsky was, by then, the most powerful prince in Rus'.  He had conquered Kiev and placed his candidate, Gleb, on the grand princely throne there.  Andrei then remained the most powerful prince in Rus until his assassination in 1174.  Thus, while the Novgorodians felt it had been miraculously delivered from Bogolyubsky's clutches in 1169, their policy of independence from him failed, and they gave in to his policies the following year.

The Battle in Legend
The legend surrounding Ilya and the Icon of the Mother of God of the Sign probably survived in oral form for some time.  It appears to have been first committed to writing during the archiepiscopate of Evfimy II (1429–1458), when he patronized the composition of the tale by Pachomius the Serb, a famous hagiographer of the period in the employ both of the Novgoodian archbishops but also of the grand princes and metropolitans in Moscow.  After writing up several of the legends surrounding Ilya under Evfimii, Pachomius went off and worked at the Trinity Monastery of St. Sergius near Moscow; he returned to Novgorod during the archiepiscopate of Iona (1458–1470) and composed a life of Ilya in which the episode figured prominently.  The tale was later included in the Books of Degrees compiled under Metropolitan Macarius of Moscow (who had been Archbishop of Novgorod prior to his metropolitanate.)

In addition to the tales surrounding the event, Evfimii II also patronized the painting of an icon which shows three scenes from the episode: Ilya taking the icon from the Church of the Transfiguration, processing over the bridge with it, and displaying it on the city walls as the Novgorodians sallied out (led by military saints) to drive off the Suzdalians.  A copy of this icon was painted in the sixteenth century as well.

The Icon of the Mother of God of the Sign which Ilya brought to the Detinets in 1169, was long kept in the Church of the Transfiguration on Ilin Street.  A new church (The Church of the Sign) was built next to it in the seventeenth century.  It was kept in the Novgorod Museum during the Soviet period and is now on display in the Cathedral of Holy Wisdom in Novgorod.  Archbishop Ilya's sarcophagus is also to be seen in the cathedral in the western gallery.

See also 
 Blessed Be the Host of the Heavenly Tsar

References

Novgorodians with the Suzdalians
Novgorodians with the Suzdalians
Novgorodians with the Suzdalians
1169 in Europe
Icons of the Tretyakov Gallery
12th century in Russia